Robert Pulsford (1814 – 3 June 1888) was a British Whig politician.

Baptised on 21 April 1815 at Church of St John-at-Hackney, Pulsford was the son of William Pulsford and Martha, daughter of William Hobson. He died in 1888 at Hennock, Devon, leaving £192,468 to three sons and five daughters.

Pulsford was elected a Whig Member of Parliament for Hereford at a by-election in 1841—caused by the resignation of Henry William Hobhouse—and held the seat until 1847 when he did not seek re-election.

References

External links
 

UK MPs 1841–1847
Whig (British political party) MPs for English constituencies
1814 births
1888 deaths